George Edwards, known by his stage name sneakguapo, is an American rapper born and raised in Seattle, Washington. He is a member of the Moor Gang rap collective. He was also a part of the Thraxxhouse rap collective.

Career 
sneakguapo released his debut album Suicide Capitol on August 2, 2013. He released the album Light-House on Jupiter on April 7, 2014, which received a positive review from Seattle Weekly. In September 2015, his EP Konica was debuted by Pigeons & Planes. After debuting the single "AYEEEE", Noisey/Vice then debuted the mixtape Glass House on December 17, 2015. His video Bust Down was debuted by Fact Magazine in October 2015. His single Put Me On was debuted by Dirty Glove Bastard in April 2016.

Sneakguapo has been main support for Lil Skies, Wifisfuneral, and Chxpo in 2018.

Discography

Studio albums 

Suicide Capitol (2013)Lighthouse on Jupiter (2014)Burn Unit (2016)GuapSeason (2017)

Mixtapes 
Glass House (2015)

EPs 
Konica (2015)

Oblivious Indigo Child (2017)

Sagiquarius (2017)

Singles 
The Child (2013)
No Sleep (From the Streets) (2014)
Dank Sinatra (2014)
Talking to a Birdie (Mackned) (2015)
Known Assassin (2015)
Martha Stewart (Mackned & FishNarc) (2015)
Bust Down (2015)
Gold House Riot (2016)
Put Me On (2016)
Trapping Out My Mommas House (2016)

References 

American rappers
Rappers from Seattle
Living people
21st-century American rappers
Year of birth missing (living people)